Kamilla Yusufovna Gafurzianova (born 18 May 1988 in Kazan) is a Russian female fencer. At the 2012 Summer Olympics she competed in the women's foil event, being defeated 7–15 in the third round by Arianna Errigo, the eventual silver medalist. She was part of the Russian team that won silver in the team foil.  In 2012, she also won the silver in the women's foil at the European Championships.

She uses left hand. She began fencing in 2004.

Awarded of  Medal of the Order "For Merit to the Fatherland"  1st class.

References

External links 
 
 
 
 
 

Russian female foil fencers
Fencers at the 2012 Summer Olympics
Medalists at the 2012 Summer Olympics
Olympic fencers of Russia
Olympic silver medalists for Russia
Olympic medalists in fencing
Universiade medalists in fencing
Recipients of the Medal of the Order "For Merit to the Fatherland" I class
1988 births
Living people
Tatar people of Russia
Sportspeople from Kazan
Universiade gold medalists for Russia
Medalists at the 2011 Summer Universiade
21st-century Russian women